Kendrick LaShawn Office (born August 2, 1978) is a former American football defensive end who played two seasons with the Buffalo Bills of the National Football League. He played college football at the University of West Alabama and attended Choctaw County High School in Butler, Alabama.

Professional career
Office was signed by the Buffalo Bills on April 24, 2001 after going undrafted in the 2001 NFL Draft. He was released by the Bills on September 2 and signed to the Bills' practice squad on September 4, 2001. Office was promoted to the active roster on October 3, 2001. He became an unrestricted free agent in 2003. Office played in 18 games for the Bills from 2001 to 2002.

References

External links
Just Sports Stats

Living people
1978 births
Players of American football from Alabama
American football defensive ends
African-American players of American football
West Alabama Tigers football players
Buffalo Bills players
People from Choctaw County, Alabama
21st-century African-American sportspeople
20th-century African-American sportspeople